The 1991–92 New York Rangers season was the franchise's 66th season. The season saw the Rangers finish in first place in the Patrick Division with a record of 50 wins, 25 losses, and 5 ties for 105 points. This was the highest points total in the league that season, netting the Rangers the Presidents' Trophy. This season marked the first time since the 1941–42 NHL season that the Rangers were the top team in the NHL. In the playoffs, they defeated their cross-river rivals, the New Jersey Devils, in seven games in the Division Semi-finals before falling to the eventual Stanley Cup champion Pittsburgh Penguins in six games in the Division Finals.

The 1991–92 season was Mark Messier's first in New York, having arrived from the Edmonton Oilers via trade on October 5, 1991. He scored 35 goals and 72 assists for 107 points, winning his second Hart Memorial Trophy as the league's Most Valuable Player. Rangers defenceman Brian Leetch had a spectacular season, leading all rearguards in the NHL in scoring (22 goals and 80 assists for 102 points) and receiving the James Norris Memorial Trophy as the league's top defenceman. The Rangers, along with the Detroit Red Wings and Pittsburgh Penguins, had five 30-goal scorers. New York was not shut out in any of their 80 regular-season games.

Pre-season

On September 27, 1991, the Rangers played the Los Angeles Kings in the first ever outdoor NHL game in Las Vegas, Nevada, at Caesars Palace. This was also the first NHL game in Las Vegas since 1968. The crowd on hand was 13,000 with the Kings beating the Rangers 5–2.

Regular season
Towards the end of the regular season, the NHL went on a 10-day strike, causing the league to shut down from April 1-April 12. The games that were originally scheduled to be played during that 10-day period were made up once the strike was over.

The Rangers had an effective penalty-killing unit, as they tied the Montreal Canadiens and the Washington Capitals for the fewest power-play goals allowed during the regular season, with just 60. The Rangers also led the NHL in penalty-killing percentage (84.81%).

Season standings

Schedule and results

|- align="center" bgcolor="#FFBBBB"
| 1 || 3 || @ Boston Bruins || 5 - 3 || 0-1-0
|- align="center" bgcolor="#CCFFCC"
| 2 || 5 || @ Montreal Canadiens || 2 - 1 OT || 1-1-0
|- align="center" bgcolor="#CCFFCC"
| 3 || 7 || Boston Bruins || 2 - 1 OT || 2-1-0
|- align="center" bgcolor="#CCFFCC"
| 4 || 9 || New York Islanders || 5 - 3 || 3-1-0
|- align="center" bgcolor="#FFBBBB"
| 5 || 11 || @ Washington Capitals || 5 - 1 || 3-2-0
|- align="center" bgcolor="#FFBBBB"
| 6 || 12 || @ Hartford Whalers || 5 - 2 || 3-3-0
|- align="center" bgcolor="#FFBBBB"
| 7 || 14 || Washington Capitals || 5 - 3 || 3-4-0
|- align="center" bgcolor="#CCFFCC"
| 8 || 16 || New Jersey Devils || 4 - 2 || 4-4-0
|- align="center" bgcolor="#CCFFCC"
| 9 || 19 || @ Pittsburgh Penguins || 5 - 4 || 5-4-0
|- align="center" bgcolor="#FFBBBB"
| 10 || 20 || Edmonton Oilers || 4 - 3 || 5-5-0
|- align="center" bgcolor="#CCFFCC"
| 11 || 23 || Los Angeles Kings || 7 - 2 || 6-5-0
|- align="center" bgcolor="#CCFFCC"
| 12 || 26 || @ Quebec Nordiques || 5 - 3 || 7-5-0
|- align="center" bgcolor="#CCFFCC"
| 13 || 29 || Minnesota North Stars || 3 - 2 || 8-5-0
|- align="center" bgcolor="#CCFFCC"
| 14 || 31 || Quebec Nordiques || 5 - 4 || 9-5-0
|-

|- align="center" bgcolor="#CCFFCC"
| 15 || 2 || @ Philadelphia Flyers || 4 - 2 || 10-5-0
|- align="center" bgcolor="#CCFFCC"
| 16 || 4 || Calgary Flames || 4 - 0 || 11-5-0
|- align="center" bgcolor="#FFBBBB"
| 17 || 6 || Montreal Canadiens || 4 - 1 || 11-6-0
|- align="center" bgcolor="white"
| 18 || 8 || Toronto Maple Leafs || 3 - 3 OT || 11-6-1
|- align="center" bgcolor="#CCFFCC"
| 19 || 11 || Pittsburgh Penguins || 3 - 1 || 12-6-1
|- align="center" bgcolor="#FFBBBB"
| 20 || 13 || Washington Capitals || 5 - 3 || 12-7-1
|- align="center" bgcolor="#FFBBBB"
| 21 || 16 || @ New York Islanders || 4 - 2 || 12-8-1
|- align="center" bgcolor="#CCFFCC"
| 22 || 19 || @ Vancouver Canucks || 4 - 3 || 13-8-1
|- align="center" bgcolor="#FFBBBB"
| 23 || 21 || @ Los Angeles Kings || 6 - 1 || 13-9-1
|- align="center" bgcolor="#CCFFCC"
| 24 || 23 || @ St. Louis Blues || 3 - 0 || 14-9-1
|- align="center" bgcolor="#FFBBBB"
| 25 || 27 || @ Winnipeg Jets || 3 - 2 || 14-10-1
|- align="center" bgcolor="#CCFFCC"
| 26 || 29 || @ Buffalo Sabres || 5 - 4 OT || 15-10-1
|-

|- align="center" bgcolor="#CCFFCC"
| 27 || 2 || Philadelphia Flyers || 4 - 2 || 16-10-1
|- align="center" bgcolor="#FFBBBB"
| 28 || 6 || @ Detroit Red Wings || 6 - 5 OT || 16-11-1
|- align="center" bgcolor="#CCFFCC"
| 29 || 8 || Boston Bruins || 4 - 0 || 17-11-1
|- align="center" bgcolor="#FFBBBB"
| 30 || 10 || @ Pittsburgh Penguins || 5 - 3 || 17-12-1
|- align="center" bgcolor="#CCFFCC"
| 31 || 13 || @ Washington Capitals || 5 - 3 || 18-12-1
|- align="center" bgcolor="#CCFFCC"
| 32 || 14 || @ Hartford Whalers || 6 - 2 || 19-12-1
|- align="center" bgcolor="#CCFFCC"
| 33 || 16 || San Jose Sharks || 4 - 3 OT || 20-12-1
|- align="center" bgcolor="#CCFFCC"
| 34 || 18 || Philadelphia Flyers || 6 - 3 || 21-12-1
|- align="center" bgcolor="#CCFFCC"
| 35 || 21 || @ Pittsburgh Penguins || 7 - 5 || 22-12-1
|- align="center" bgcolor="#CCFFCC"
| 36 || 23 || New Jersey Devils || 3 - 0 || 23-12-1
|- align="center" bgcolor="#CCFFCC"
| 37 || 26 || @ Washington Capitals || 8 - 6 || 24-12-1
|- align="center" bgcolor="#FFBBBB"
| 38 || 28 || @ New York Islanders || 5 - 4 || 24-13-1
|- align="center" bgcolor="#FFBBBB"
| 39 || 29 || Pittsburgh Penguins || 6 - 3 || 24-14-1
|- align="center" bgcolor="#CCFFCC"
| 40 || 31 || @ Winnipeg Jets || 5 - 2 || 25-14-1
|-

|- align="center" bgcolor="#CCFFCC"
| 41 || 2 || @ Chicago Blackhawks || 4 - 3 || 26-14-1
|- align="center" bgcolor="#FFBBBB"
| 42 || 4 || @ New Jersey Devils || 6 - 4 || 26-15-1
|- align="center" bgcolor="#CCFFCC"
| 43 || 6 || Winnipeg Jets || 4 - 2 || 27-15-1
|- align="center" bgcolor="#FFBBBB"
| 44 || 8 || St. Louis Blues || 5 - 3 || 27-16-1
|- align="center" bgcolor="#CCFFCC"
| 45 || 11 || @ Quebec Nordiques || 7 - 2 || 28-16-1
|- align="center" bgcolor="#FFBBBB"
| 46 || 12 || @ Buffalo Sabres || 6 - 3 || 28-17-1
|- align="center" bgcolor="#CCFFCC"
| 47 || 14 || Buffalo Sabres || 6 - 2 || 29-17-1
|- align="center" bgcolor="#CCFFCC"
| 48 || 16 || Calgary Flames || 6 - 4 || 30-17-1
|- align="center" bgcolor="white"
| 49 || 22 || @ Calgary Flames || 4 - 4 OT || 30-17-2
|- align="center" bgcolor="#CCFFCC"
| 50 || 23 || @ Edmonton Oilers || 3 - 1 || 31-17-2
|- align="center" bgcolor="#CCFFCC"
| 51 || 28 || @ San Jose Sharks || 4 - 2 || 32-17-2
|- align="center" bgcolor="#CCFFCC"
| 52 || 30 || @ Los Angeles Kings || 4 - 1 || 33-17-2
|-

|- align="center" bgcolor="#CCFFCC"
| 53 || 1 || @ Minnesota North Stars || 2 - 1 || 34-17-2
|- align="center" bgcolor="#CCFFCC"
| 54 || 5 || Pittsburgh Penguins || 4 - 3 || 35-17-2
|- align="center" bgcolor="#FFBBBB"
| 55 || 7 || @ Washington Capitals || 6 - 2 || 35-18-2
|- align="center" bgcolor="white"
| 56 || 9 || Detroit Red Wings || 5 - 5 OT || 35-18-3
|- align="center" bgcolor="#CCFFCC"
| 57 || 12 || Vancouver Canucks || 5 - 2 || 36-18-3
|- align="center" bgcolor="#CCFFCC"
| 58 || 14 || New York Islanders || 9 - 2 || 37-18-3
|- align="center" bgcolor="#FFBBBB"
| 59 || 16 || @ New Jersey Devils || 4 - 2 || 37-19-3
|- align="center" bgcolor="white"
| 60 || 17 || Vancouver Canucks || 3 - 3 OT || 37-19-4
|- align="center" bgcolor="#FFBBBB"
| 61 || 20 || @ New York Islanders || 6 - 2 || 37-20-4
|- align="center" bgcolor="#CCFFCC"
| 62 || 21 || Minnesota North Stars || 5 - 4 || 38-20-4
|- align="center" bgcolor="#CCFFCC"
| 63 || 23 || Philadelphia Flyers || 2 - 1 OT || 39-20-4
|- align="center" bgcolor="#CCFFCC"
| 64 || 25 || Chicago Blackhawks || 4 - 1 || 40-20-4
|-

|- align="center" bgcolor="#CCFFCC"
| 65 || 1 || Hartford Whalers || 9 - 4 || 41-20-4
|- align="center" bgcolor="#CCFFCC"
| 66 || 2 || @ New Jersey Devils || 7 - 1 || 42-20-4
|- align="center" bgcolor="#FFBBBB"
| 67 || 4 || New Jersey Devils || 5 - 4 || 42-21-4
|- align="center" bgcolor="#FFBBBB"
| 68 || 7 || @ Philadelphia Flyers || 5 - 4 || 42-22-4
|- align="center" bgcolor="#FFBBBB"
| 69 || 9 || Washington Capitals || 5 - 2 || 42-23-4
|- align="center" bgcolor="#CCFFCC"
| 70 || 11 || Chicago Blackhawks || 7 - 1 || 43-23-4
|- align="center" bgcolor="#CCFFCC"
| 71 || 14 || @ St. Louis Blues || 6 - 0 || 44-23-4
|- align="center" bgcolor="#CCFFCC"
| 72 || 16 || Montreal Canadiens || 4 - 1 || 45-23-4
|- align="center" bgcolor="white"
| 73 || 18 || New York Islanders || 1 - 1 OT || 45-23-5
|- align="center" bgcolor="#CCFFCC"
| 74 || 20 || @ Detroit Red Wings || 4 - 2 || 46-23-5
|- align="center" bgcolor="#CCFFCC"
| 75 || 22 || New Jersey Devils || 6 - 3 || 47-23-5
|- align="center" bgcolor="#CCFFCC"
| 76 || 24 || @ Philadelphia Flyers || 4 - 3 || 48-23-5
|- align="center" bgcolor="#CCFFCC"
| 77 || 25 || Philadelphia Flyers || 4 - 1 || 49-23-5
|- align="center" bgcolor="#FFBBBB"
| 78 || 28 || @ New York Islanders || 4 - 1 || 49-24-5
|-

|- align="center" bgcolor="#FFBBBB"
| 79 || 15 || @ Toronto Maple Leafs || 4 - 2 || 49-25-5
|- align="center" bgcolor="#CCFFCC"
| 80 || 16 || Pittsburgh Penguins || 7 - 1 || 50-25-5
|-

Playoffs

Key:  Win  Loss

Player statistics
Skaters

Goaltenders

†Denotes player spent time with another team before joining Rangers. Stats reflect time with Rangers only.
‡Traded mid-season. Stats reflect time with Rangers only.

Transactions

Trades

Draft picks
New York's picks at the 1991 NHL Entry Draft in Buffalo, New York at the Memorial Auditorium.

Supplemental Draft
New York's picks at the 1991 NHL Supplemental Draft.

Awards and records
 Presidents' Trophy: New York Rangers
 Hart Memorial Trophy: Mark Messier
 James Norris Memorial Trophy: Brian Leetch
 Lester B. Pearson Award: Mark Messier
 Most assists, season – Brian Leetch (1991–92) – 80
 Most points by defenceman, season – Brian Leetch (1991–92) – 102

References

External links
 Rangers on Hockey Database

New York Rangers seasons
New York Rangers
New York Rangers
New York Rangers
New York Rangers
1990s in Manhattan
Madison Square Garden
Patrick Division champion seasons
Presidents' Trophy seasons